Eames is a surname. Notable people with the surname include:

 Aled Eames (1921–1996), Welsh maritime historian
 Arthur Johnson Eames (1881–1969), American botanist
 Benjamin T. Eames (1818–1901), American politician, U.S. Representative from Rhode Island
 Charles and Ray Eames, American husband-and-wife design team: Charles (1907–1978) and Ray (1912–1988)
 Clare Eames (1894–1930), American actress
 Elizabeth Jessup Eames (1813-1856), American writer
 Emma Eames (1865–1952), American opera soprano
 Fidelma Healy Eames, Irish politician
 Francis L. Eames (1844–1912), American banker who served as president of the New York Stock Exchange
 Fred Eames, American billiards champion
 Marion Eames (1921–2007), Welsh novelist
 Mark Eames (born 1961), Hong Kong cricketer
 Rebecca Eames (1640–1721), Massachusetts woman accused of being a witch at the Salem witch trials
 Robin Eames (born 1937), Anglican Primate of All Ireland and Archbishop of Armagh
 Rosemary Eames (later Elliott; 1965–2002), Australian Paralympic swimmer

Fictional characters
 Alexandra Eames, lead character on Law and Order: Criminal Intent
 Eames, a crossbow-bearing warlock in Charmed (e.g., in the Season 3, episode 11, "Blinded by the Whitelighter")
 Eames, in the film Inception

See also
 Eames, Indiana, a community in the United States
 Eames: The Architect and the Painter (2011), a film documentary
 Eames House, a National Historic Landmark in Los Angeles
 Eames Lounge Chair
 Eames Lounge Chair Wood
 Eames Aluminum Group
 Emes